Roman Vassilenkov (born 8 October 1996) is a Kazakhstani racing cyclist. He rode in the men's points race at the 2020 UCI Track Cycling World Championships.

Major results
2014
 1st  Individual pursuit, Asian Track Championships
2017
 1st  Team pursuit, Asian Indoor and Martial Arts Games
 1st  Elimination race, National Track Championships
 3rd Six Days of Turin
2019
 1st  Madison, National Track Championships (with Alisher Zhumakan)
 3rd  Team pursuit, Asian Track Championships
 4th Overall Tour of Kayseri
 6th Grand Prix Erciyes
2020
 Asian Track Championships
3rd  Points race
3rd  Madison
2021
 9th GP Manavgat
 10th Grand Prix Alanya

References

1996 births
Living people
Kazakhstani male cyclists
Kazakhstani track cyclists
20th-century Kazakhstani people
21st-century Kazakhstani people